A Bright Personality or  is a 1988 fantastic satirical comedy based on the works of Ilf and Petrov, directed by Alexander Pavlovsky at the Odessa film studio. The film consists of two parts: the "Dark Past" and "Bright Future".

Plot
In provincial Pischeslav (original name of the small town is Kukuyevo) there is a powerful and respectable organization named KLOOP. A job in KLOOP is a cherished dream of every inhabitant of Pischeslav, but for what purpose was this office created and what does it do in reality – is a mystery even to the KLOOP workers. In fact the KLOOP are a bunch of bureaucrats and penpushers who simply receive public money.

In KLOOP works Egor Filyurin whose neighbor in his communal apartment is a local celebrity – inventor Babsky. Most of his inventions are absurd and useless but when Babsky invents soap for removing freckles, something amazing happens. Having washed himself with this soap when taking a bath Filyurin becomes invisible! His ability to penetrate unnoticed by all institutions allows him very often to identify such tenacious evils as bureaucracy, arrogance, careerism, nepotism.

The leadership of KLOOP is very concerned with the current situation. Head of KLOOP Cain Dobroglasov using the "Time Machine" – another invention of the restless Babsky – prepares to travel into the future when he comes to the conclusion that in the present time he is to be removed from his post. But Filyurin's invisibility suddenly disappears, and life in the city of Pischeslav begins to flow in a quiet bureaucratic line once again...

Cast
 Nikolai Karachentsov – Egor Karlovich Filyurin, KLOOP's clerk
 Aleksandra Yakovleva – Rita Haritullina, Filyurin's co-worker
 Mikhail Svetin – Ptashnikov, Filyurin's co-worker
 Galina Polskikh – Ptashnikova, Ptashnikov's wife and Filyurin's co-worker
 Andrey Ankudinov – Kostya Ptashnikov, Ptashnikov's son and Filyurin's co-worker
 Svetlana Kryuchkova – Segidilia Karpovna, head of KLOOP's trade union
 Boryslav Brondukov – head of KLOOP's personnel
 Victor Pavlov – Cain Alexandrovich Dobroglasov, head of KLOOP
 Vsevolod Shilovsky – Abel Alexandrovich Dobroglasov, deputy head of KLOOP, Cain's brother
 Abesalom Loria – Babsky, inventor
 Aleksandr Demyanenko – Spravchenko, doctor
 Igor Dmitriev – Bernardov, the former lead singer of the Imperial Opera
 Mikhail Kokshenov – Boris Abramovich Godunov, painter
 Viktor Ilichyov – Yusupov
 Vladimir Tatosov – cashier-accountant 
 Sergey Migitsko – Mr. Pip, foreigner
 Veronika Izotova – Caina Dobroglasova, Cain's secretary, Abel's mistress
 Nikolay Slyozka – attendant
 Alla Budnitskaya – guide
 Armen Dzhigarkhanyan – narrator

References

External links

1980s musical comedy films
Soviet musical comedy films
1980s Russian-language films
Films scored by Maksim Dunayevsky
1988 comedy films
1988 films